Bauhinia integerrima is a species of plant in the family Fabaceae, in Brazil. The plant is endemic to southern Bahia state, in the Atlantic Forest ecoregion of Southeast Brazil.

References

integerrima
Endemic flora of Brazil
Flora of Bahia
Flora of the Atlantic Forest
Endangered flora of South America
Taxonomy articles created by Polbot